Religious tourism, spiritual tourism, sacred tourism, or faith tourism, is a type of tourism with two main subtypes: pilgrimage, meaning travel for religious or spiritual purposes, and the viewing of religious monuments and artefacts, a branch of sightseeing.

Types

Religious tourism has been characterised in different ways by researchers. Gisbert Rinschede distinguishes these by duration, by group size, and by social structure. Juli Gevorgian proposes two categories that differ in their motivation, namely "pilgrimage tourism" for spiritual reasons or to participate in religious rites, and "church tourism" to view monuments such as cathedrals. The Christian priest Frank Fahey writes that a pilgrim is "always in danger of becoming a tourist", and vice versa since travel always in his view upsets the fixed order of life at home, and identifies eight differences between the two:

Pilgrimage

Pilgrimage is spiritually- or religiously motivated travel, sometimes over long distances; it has been practised since antiquity and in several of the world's religions. The world's largest mass religious assemblage takes place in India at the Kumbh Mela, which attracts over 120 million pilgrims. Other major pilgrimages include the annual Hajj to Mecca, required once in a Muslim's life.

Religious sightseeing

Religious sightseeing can be motivated by any of several kinds of interest, such as religion, art, architecture, history, and personal ancestry.
People can find holy places interesting and moving, whether they personally are religious or not. Some, such as the churches of Italy, offer fine architecture and major artworks. Portugal, for example, has as its main religious tourism attraction the Sanctuary of Our Lady of Fátima, internationally known by the phenomenon of Marian apparitions. Others are important to world religions: Jerusalem holds a central place in Judaism, Christianity, Hinduism and Islam. Others again may be both scenic and important to one religion, like the Way of Saint James in Spain, but have been adopted by non-religious people as a personal challenge and indeed as a journey of self-discovery. Religious tourism in India can take many forms, including yoga tourism; the country has sites important to Buddhism, Islam, Sikhism and Hinduism, as well as magnificent architecture and, for some travellers, the attraction of orientalism. Japan too offers beautiful religious places from Buddhist temples to Shinto shrines.

Secular pilgrimage

A category intermediate between pilgrims belonging to a major world religion and pure tourism is the modern concept of secular pilgrimage to places such as the Himalayas felt to be in some way special or even sacred, and where the travel is neither purely pious, nor purely for pleasure, but is to some degree "compromised". For example, New Age believers may travel to such "spiritual hotspots"  with the intention of healing themselves and the world. They may practise rituals involving (supposedly) leaving their bodies, possession by spirits (channelling), and recovery of past life memories. The travel is considered by many scholars as transcendental, a life learning process or even a self-realization metaphor.

See also

 Devotional articles
 Christian tourism
 Halal tourism
 Kosher tourism

References

Further reading 

 Ralf van Bühren, Lorenzo Cantoni, and Silvia De Ascaniis (eds.), Special issue on “Tourism, Religious Identity and Cultural Heritage”, in Church, Communication and Culture 3 (2018), pp. 195–418
 Razaq Raj and Nigel D. Morpeth, Religious tourism and pilgrimage festivals management: an international perspective, CABI, 2007
 Dallen J. Timothy and Daniel H. Olsen, Tourism, religion and spiritual journeys, Routledge, 2006
 University of Lincoln (Department of tourism and recreation), Tourism – the spiritual dimension. Conference. Lincoln (Lincolnshire) 2006
 N. Ross Crumrine and E. Alan Morinis, Pilgrimage in Latin America, Westport CT 1991

External links

 Encyclopedia of Religion and Society: Pilgrimage/Tourism (history from ancient times)
 USA TODAY: 10 Great Places to Mark Christianity's Holiest Day (on Christian sacred places such as St Peter's, Rome, St John's cave on Patmos, and the grotto at Lourdes)
 CBS Early Show: Rest, relaxation, & religion
 USA TODAY: On a wing and a prayer (on James Dobson and Focus on the Family in Colorado)
 Washington Post: Seeking answers with field trips in faith (on Our Lady of Medjugorje, Bosnia)

 
Religious practices
Types of tourism